The United States Senate election of 1948 in New Jersey was held on November 2, 1948. 

Incumbent Republican Senator Albert Hawkes did not seek re-election to a second term. Republican State Treasurer Robert C. Hendrickson defeated Princeton attorney Archibald S. Alexander in a close race. This remains the last senate election in which a resident of South Jersey with elected to the Senate.

Republican primary

Candidates

Declared
Harry Harper, Commissioner of Labor and Industry and former Major League Baseball pitcher
Robert C. Hendrickson, New Jersey Treasurer

Declined
Albert Hawkes, incumbent Senator

Results

Democratic primary

Candidates
Archibald S. Alexander, attorney and Army Lieutenant Colonel (ret.)

Results
Alexander was unopposed for the Democratic nomination.

General election

Candidates
Archibald S. Alexander (Democrat), attorney and Army Lieutenant Colonel (ret.)
George E. Bopp (Socialist Labor)
George Breitman (Socialist Workers), activist and editor of The Militant
Robert C. Hendrickson (Republican), New Jersey Treasurer
James Imbrie (Progressive)
Rubye Smith (Socialist)
George W. Rideout (Prohibition)

Results

See also 
1948 United States Senate elections

References

New Jersey
1948
1948 New Jersey elections